Martijn Fischer (born 28 January 1968) is a Dutch actor.

Career 

In 2015, he won the Golden Calf for Best Actor award for playing the Dutch singer André Hazes in the film Bloed, zweet & tranen. Hadewych Minis won the Golden Calf for Best Supporting Actress and Raymond Thiry won the Golden Calf for Best Supporting Actor for their roles in the film.

In 2016, he played the role of Jesus in The Passion.

He played a lead role in the 2018 film Mannen van Mars.

Awards 

 2015: Golden Calf for Best Actor, Bloed, zweet & tranen

Selected filmography 

 2003: Love to Love
 2004: Floris
 2006: Keep Off
 2007: De Scheepsjongens van Bontekoe
 2015: Bloed, zweet & tranen
 2018: Redbad
 2020: Men at Work: Miami

References

External links 
 

1968 births
Living people
20th-century Dutch male actors
21st-century Dutch male actors
Dutch male actors
Dutch male film actors
Dutch male television actors
Golden Calf winners
Actors from Utrecht (city)